Sophie Mary Wilson   (born Roger Wilson; June 1957) is an English computer scientist, who helped design the BBC Micro and ARM architecture.

Wilson first designed a microcomputer during a break from studies at Selwyn College, Cambridge. She subsequently joined Acorn Computers and was instrumental in designing the BBC Micro, including the BBC BASIC programming language whose development she led for the next 15 years. She first began designing the ARM reduced instruction set computer (RISC) in 1983, which entered production two years later. It became popular in embedded systems and is now the most widely used processor architecture in smartphones. Wilson is currently a director at the technology conglomerate Broadcom Inc. In 2011, she was listed in Maximum PC as number 8 in an article titled "The 15 Most Important Women in Tech History". She was made a Commander of the British Empire in 2019.

Early life and education
Born Roger Wilson, she was raised in Leeds, Yorkshire, by parents who were both teachers, her father specialising in English and her mother in physics. From 1975, she studied computer science and the Mathematical Tripos at Selwyn College, University of Cambridge and was a member of their Microprocessor society. In an Easter break from university, Wilson designed a microcomputer with a MOS Technology 6502 microprocessor, inspired by the earlier MK14, which was used to electronically control feed for cows.

Career
In 1978, she joined Acorn Computers Ltd, after designing a device to prevent cigarette lighter sparks triggering payouts on fruit machines. Her computer design was used by Chris Curry and Hermann Hauser to build the Acorn Micro-Computer, the first of a long line of computers sold by the company.

In July 1981, Wilson extended the Acorn Atom's BASIC programming language dialect into an improved version for the Acorn Proton, a microcomputer that enabled Acorn to win the contract with the British Broadcasting Corporation (BBC) for their ambitious computer education project. Hauser employed a deception, telling both Wilson and colleague Steve Furber that the other had agreed a prototype could be built within a week. Taking up the challenge, she designed the system including the circuit board and components from Monday to Wednesday, which required fast new DRAM integrated circuits to be sourced directly from Hitachi. By Thursday evening, a prototype had been built, but the software had bugs, requiring her to stay up all night and into Friday debugging. Wilson recalled watching the wedding of Prince Charles and Lady Diana Spencer on a small portable television while attempting to debug and re-solder the prototype. It was a success with the BBC, who awarded Acorn the contract. Along with Furber, Wilson was present backstage at the machine's first airing on television, in case any software fixes were required. She later described the event as "a unique moment in time when the public wanted to know how this stuff works and could be shown and taught how to programme."

The Proton became the BBC Micro and its BASIC evolved into BBC BASIC, whose development was led by Wilson for the next 15 years. As well as programming, she wrote the manuals and technical specifications, realising communication was an important part of being successful.

In October 1983, Wilson began designing the instruction set for one of the first reduced instruction set computer (RISC) processors, the Acorn RISC Machine (ARM). The ARM1 was delivered on 26 April 1985 and worked first time. This processor type was later to become one of the most successful IP cores – a licensed CPU core – and by 2012 was being used in 95% of smartphones.

Wilson designed Acorn Replay, the video architecture for Acorn machines. This included operating system extensions for video access, as well as the codecs, optimized to run high frame rate video on ARM CPUs from the ARM 2 onwards.

She was a non-executive director of the technology and games company Eidos plc, which bought and created Eidos Interactive, for the years following its flotation in 1990. She was a consultant to ARM Ltd when it was split off from Acorn in 1990.

Since the demise of Acorn Computers, Wilson has made a small number of public appearances to talk about work done there.

She is now the Director of IC Design in Broadcom's Cambridge, UK office. She was the Chief Architect of Broadcom's Firepath processor. Firepath has its history in Acorn Computers, which, after being renamed to Element 14, was broken up in an acquisition, with the Element 14 name being transferred to a new company, this company eventually being bought by Broadcom in 2000.

Wilson was listed in 2011 in Maximum PC as number 8 in an article titled "The 15 Most Important Women in Tech History".

Honours and awards
Wilson was awarded the Fellow Award by the Computer History Museum in California in 2012 "for her work, with Steve Furber, on the BBC Micro computer and the ARM processor architecture." In 2009, she was elected as a Fellow of the Royal Academy of Engineering and, in 2013, as a Fellow of the Royal Society. Wilson received the 2014 Lovie Lifetime Achievement Award in acknowledgement for her invention of the ARM processor. In 2016, she became an honorary fellow of her alma mater, Selwyn College, Cambridge. In 2020, she was honoured as a Distinguished Fellow of the British Computer Society.

Wilson was appointed Commander of the Order of the British Empire (CBE) in the 2019 Birthday Honours for services to computing.

Personal life
Wilson underwent gender reassignment surgery and transitioned from male to female in 1994. She enjoys photography and is involved in a local theatre group, where she is in charge of costumes and set pieces and has acted in a number of productions. She has also played a cameo role as a pub landlady in the BBC television drama Micro Men, in which a younger Wilson is played by Stefan Butler.

See also
List of pioneers in computer science

References

Sources

External links
An interview with Sophie Wilson
Interviewed by Alan Macfarlane 21 May 2017 (video)

1957 births
Living people
People from Leeds
People from East Cambridgeshire District
Scientists from Yorkshire
Alumni of Selwyn College, Cambridge
21st-century women engineers
British computer scientists
Transgender scientists
Transgender women
Transgender academics
British women computer scientists
British LGBT scientists
Female Fellows of the Royal Society
Female Fellows of the Royal Academy of Engineering
Fellows of the Royal Society
Fellows of the Royal Academy of Engineering
Fellows of the British Computer Society
Fellows of Selwyn College, Cambridge
Fellows of the Women's Engineering Society
Commanders of the Order of the British Empire
Arm Holdings people
Acorn Computers
English LGBT people